Sahil is a Baku Metro station. It was opened on 6 November 1967.

See also
List of Baku metro stations

References

Baku Metro stations
Railway stations opened in 1967
1967 establishments in Azerbaijan